Haliclona caerulea is a species of marine sponge in the family Chalinidae. It is an encrusting tubular sponge that grows anchored on rocky surfaces of coral reefs.

Name
The name of the species relates to its blue color: Latin caeruleus: cerulean blue, like the sky, or the ocean.

Morphology
Haliclona caerulea takes the form of an encrusting mass of cylindrical to volcano-shaped projections between 2 and 15 cm, with oscula at the high end. The oscula are circular or oval, and between 1.3 and 5.0 mm in diameter.  The body has radial symmetry and consists, on the outside, of flattened cells known as pinacocytes. The inner part is formed by cells called choanocytes, equipped with a flagellum.  These cells have a dual function: ingesting food particles, and maintaining the flow of water through the sponge's body. Between the two layers a more or less gelatinous substance called mesohyl.   Sclerocyte cells are responsible for secreting a kind of skeleton for supporting the sponge's body, formed of spongin fibers.

As its name suggests, the most common color is blue, but individuals may be beige or white.

Distribution
Its geographic distribution includes the western tropical Atlantic, from Florida and the Gulf of Mexico, to the Caribbean Sea, reaching the West Indies and the Pacific coast of Mexico and Panama. is also found on the islands of Hawaii and Guam, and its unintended introduction that reached these islands from biofouling on the hulls of ships.

Habitat and ecological roles
It is commonly seen growing in beds of the seagrass Thalassia, and in rocky coral rubble habitats. Studies reported their symbiosis with calcareous alga Jania adhaerens.

Aquaria
Haliclona cerulea can sometimes be found in the aquarium trade, often sold simply as "Haliclona sp."

References

caerulea
Animals described in 1965